Lövsta (also known as Roma kyrkby) is a locality on the Swedish island of Gotland, with 261 inhabitants in 2010.

In 1995 the locality known as Roma was divided by Statistics Sweden into a part with the tentative name of "Roma kyrkby" (pop. 277) and the remaining part that was referred to as Roma (pop. 902).  It was given the name "Romakloster" as a postal address to avoid confusion with the Italian capital.
Some confusion is caused by the fact that Lövsta/Roma kyrkby has been referred to as "Roma" in the statistical figures since 2000.

The medieval Roma Church is in Lövsta. , Roma Church belongs to Roma parish in Romaklosters pastorat.

Notes

References 
Tätorter 1995 (Statistiska meddelanden. Serie Be, Stockholm: SCB, Programmet för regional planering och naturresurser, 1996. Beställningsnummer Be 16 SM 9601.
Tätorter 2000. Sveriges Officiella statistik. Statistiska meddelanden Serie MI. MI 38 SM 0101. Stockholm: SCB, 2002.

External links 

Populated places in Gotland County